Dans Eder misin? ("Will You Dance?"), also known as Huysuz'la Dans Eder misin? in its sixth season, is a Turkish dance competition show based on the format of American show So You Think You Can Dance.   The series has aired on several different networks, including Kanal D, FOX (Turkey), ATV, and Show TV.

See also
Dance on television

References

So You Think You Can Dance
Turkish television series
2007 Turkish television series debuts
2011 Turkish television series endings
Dance competition television shows
Kanal D original programming
Fox (Turkish TV channel) original programming
ATV (Turkey) original programming
Show TV original programming
Turkish television series based on American television series